The Latin Patriarchate of Constantinople was an office established as a result of the Fourth Crusade and its conquest of Constantinople in 1204. It was a Roman Catholic replacement for the Eastern Orthodox Ecumenical Patriarchate of Constantinople, and remained in the city until the reconquest of Constantinople by the Byzantines in 1261, whereupon it became a titular see. The office was abolished in 1964.

History
Before the East–West Schism in 1054, the Christian Church within the borders of the ancient Roman Empire was effectively ruled by five patriarchs (the "Pentarchy"): In descending order of precedence: Rome by the Bishop of Rome (who rarely used the title "Patriarch") and those of Constantinople, Alexandria, Antioch, and Jerusalem.

In the West the Bishop of Rome was recognized as having superiority over the other Patriarchs, while in the East, the Patriarch of Constantinople gradually came to occupy a leading position. The sees of Rome and Constantinople were often at odds with one another, just as the Greek and Latin Churches as a whole were often at odds both politically and in things ecclesiastical. There were complex cultural currents underlying these difficulties. The tensions led in 1054 to a serious rupture between the Greek East and Latin West called the East–West Schism, which while not in many places absolute, still dominates the ecclesiastical landscape.

In 1204, the Fourth Crusade invaded, seized and sacked Constantinople, and established the Latin Empire. The Pope, who was not involved, initially spoke out against the Crusade, writing in a letter to his legate, "How, indeed, is the Greek church to be brought back into ecclesiastical union and to a devotion for the Apostolic See when she has been beset with so many afflictions and persecutions that she sees in the Latins only an example of perdition and the works of darkness, so that she now, and with reason, detests the Latins more than dogs?" However the popes accepted the Latin patriarchate established by Catholic clergy that accompanied the Crusade, similar to Latin patriarchates previously established in the Crusader states of the Holy Land. The pope recognised these "Latin" sees at the Fourth Council of the Lateran. Furthermore, those Orthodox bishops left in their place were made to swear an oath of allegiance to the pope.

However, the Latin Empire in Constantinople was eventually defeated and dispossessed by a resurgent Byzantium in 1261. Since that time Latin Patriarch Pantaleonе Giustinian (d. 1286) resided in the West, though continuing to oversee the remaining Latin Catholic dioceses in various parts of Latin Greece. The continuing threat of a Catholic Crusade to restore the Latin Empire, championed by the ambitious Charles I of Anjou, led to the first attempts, on the Byzantine side, to effect a Union of the Churches. After the Union of Lyon (1274), John Bekkos was installed as a Greek Catholic Patriarch of Constantinople in 1275, but that did not affect the position of Pantaleonе Giustinian. His Greek Catholic counterpart was deposed in 1282 by Eastern Orthodox hierarchy, thus ending a short-lived union. in 1286, Latin Patriarch Pantaleonе Giustinian was succeeded by Pietro Correr who was the first holder of that office in a new form of a titular see.

On 8 February 1314, Pope Clement V united the Patriarchate with the episcopal see of Negroponte (Chalcis), hitherto a suffragan of the Latin Archbishopric of Athens, so that the patriarchs could once more have a territorial diocese on Greek soil and exercise a direct role as the head of the Latin clergy in what remained of Latin Greece.

For a time, like many ecclesiastical offices in the West, it had rival contenders who were supporters or protégés of the rival popes. As to the title Latin Patriarch of Constantinople, this was the case at least from 1378 to 1423. Thereafter the office continued as an honorific title, during the later centuries attributed to a leading clergyman in Rome, until it ceased to be assigned after 1948 and was suppressed in January 1964, along with the titles of Latin Patriarchs of Alexandria and Antioch.

A Vicariate Apostolic of Istanbul (until 1990, Constantinople) has existed from 1742 into the present day.

List of Latin Patriarchs of Constantinople 
 Tommaso Morosini (1204–1211)
 Vacant (1211–1215)
 Gervasio (1215–1219)
 Vacant (1219–1221)
 Matteo (1221–1226)
 Jean Halgrin (1226), declined office
 Simon of Maugastel (1227–1233)
 Vacant (1233–1234)
 Niccolò Visconti da Castro Arquato (1234–1251)
 Vacant (1251–1253)
 Pantaleonе Giustinian (1253–1286); After 1261, resided in the West
 Pietro Correr (1286–1302)
 Leonardo Faliero (1302–c. 1305)
 Nicholas of Thebes (c. 1308–c. 1335), later cardinal (1332–1335)
  (1335–1339)
 Rolando d'Asti (1339) (died immediately)
 Enrico d'Asti (1339–1345), bishop of Negroponte
 Stephen of Pinu (1346)
 William (1346–1364)
 Pierre Thomas (1364–1366)
 Paul (1366–1370)
 Ugolino Malabranca de Orvieto (1371–c. 1375), bishop of Rimini
  (1376–1378), archbishop of Otranto
 Paul Palaiologos Tagaris (1379/80–1384)
 Vacant (1384–1390)
 Angelo Correr (1390–1405), later Pope Gregory XII
 Louis of Mytilene (Ludovico? Luiz?) (1406–1408)
 Antonio Correr (1408)
 Alfonso of Seville (1408)
 Francesco Lando (1409), patriarch of Grado
 Giovanni Contarini (1409–c. 1412)
 Jean de la Rochetaillée (1412–1423)
 Giovanni Contarini (1424–1430?), restored
 François de Conzié (1430–1432)
 Vacant (1432–1438)
 Francesco Condulmer (1438–1453)
 Gregory Mammas (1453–1458), formerly Orthodox Patriarch of Constantinople as Gregory III
 Isidore of Kiev (1458–1462)
 Bessarion (1463–1472)
 Pietro Riario (1472–1474)
 Girolamo Lando (1474–c. 1496), Archbishop of Crete
 Giovanni Michiel (1497–1503) Bishop of Verona, later Cardinal
 Juan de Borja Lanzol de Romaní, el mayor (1503)
 Francisco Galcerán de Lloris y de Borja (1503–1506)
 Marco Cornaro (1506–1507)
 Tamás Bakócz (1507–1521)
 Marco Cornaro (1521–1524), restored
 Giles of Viterbo (1524–1530), Cardinal bishop of Viterbo
 Francesco Pesaro (1530–1545) Archbishop of Zadar
 Marino Grimani (1545–1546)
 Ranuccio Farnese (1546–1550)
 Fabio Colonna (1550–1554), bishop of Aversa
 Ranuccio Farnese (1554–1565) restored
 Scipione Rebiba (1565–1573) Cardinal bishop of Albano
 Prospero Rebiba (1573–1593) Bishop of Troia
 Silvio Savelli (cardinal) (1594–1596)
 Ercole Tassoni (1596–1597)
 Bonifazio Bevilacqua Aldobrandini (1598–1627?)
 Bonaventura Secusio (1599–1618)
 Ascanio Gesualdo (1618–1638)
 Francesco Maria Macchiavelli (1640–1641)
 Giovanni Giacomo Panciroli (1641–1643)
 Giovanni Battista Spada (1643–1675?)
 Volumnio Bandinelli (1658–1660), later Cardinal
 Stefano Ugolini (1667–1681)
 Odoardo Cibo (Cybo) (1689–1706?), titular archbishop of Seleucia in Isauria
 Luigi Pico della Mirandola (1706–1712)
 Andrea Riggio (1716–1717)
 Camillo Cibo (Cybo) (1718–1729)
 Mondillo Orsini (1729–1751)
 Ferdinando Maria de Rossi (1751–1759)
 Filippo Caucci (1760–1771)
 Juan Portugal de la Puebla (1771–1781), later cardinal
 Francesco Antonio Marcucci (1781–1798)
 Benedetto Fenaja (1805–1823)
 Giuseppe della Porta Rodiani (1823–1835)
 Cardinal Giovanni Soglia Ceroni (1835–1839)
 Antonio Maria Traversi (1839–1842)
 Giovanni Giacomo Sinibaldi (1843)
 Cardinal Fabio Maria Asquini (1844–1845)
 Giovanni Giuseppe Canali (1845–1851)
 Domenico Lucciardi (1851–1860)
 Giuseppe Melchiade Ferlisi (1860–1865)
 Ruggero Luigi Emidio Antici Mattei (1866–1878)
 Giacomo Gallo (1878–1881)
 Vacant (1881–1887)
 Giulio Lenti (1887–1895)
Cardinal Giovanni Battista Casali del Drago (1895–1899)
Cardinal Alessandro Sanminiatelli Zabarella (1899–1901)
 Cardinal Carlo Nocella (1901–1903), died 1908, former Latin Patriarch of Antioch
 Giuseppe Ceppetelli (1903–1917)
 Vacant (1917–1923)
 Michele Zezza di Zapponeta (1923–1927)
 Antonio Anastasio Rossi (1927–1948)
 Vacancy from 1948 until the Latin titular patriarchate was abolished in 1964.

See also 
 List of Popes
 Latin Patriarch of Alexandria
 Latin Patriarch of Antioch
 Latin Patriarch of Jerusalem
 Latin Archbishop of Athens
 Latin Archbishop of Corinth
 Latin Archbishop of Crete
 Latin Archbishop of Neopatras
 Latin Archbishop of Patras
 Latin Archbishop of Thebes

References

Sources and external links
 Giorgio Fedalto, La Chiesa latina in Oriente, Mazziana, Verona, 2nd ed. 1981, e vol.
 
 
 
 List of Latin Patriarchs of Constantinople by GCatholic.org 
 Catholic Hierarchy

Frankokratia
Former Roman Catholic dioceses in Asia
Former Roman Catholic dioceses in Europe
Latin Empire
 
East–West Schism
Lists of Roman Catholics
Turkey religion-related lists
1204 establishments in Europe
1964 disestablishments in Italy